The Duar War (or Anglo-Bhutan War) was a war fought between British India and Bhutan in 1864 to 1865. It has been the only military conflict between the two states since 1774.

Background
Across the nineteenth century, British India commissioned multiple missions to Bhutan. Official documents always cited cross-border raids by Bhutan or sheltering of dissidents as the immediate cause; however, modern historians note Britain's imperialist ambitions in the region to be the actual pretext. Not only was Bhutan a vital cog in the Indo-Tibetan trade but also the commercial viability of Duars region for supporting tea plantations was well-known among Company officials. 

The most significant of these was a "peace mission" under Ashley Eden in 1863-64, which was dispatched in the wake of a civil war. However, Bhutan rejected the offer and Eden claimed to have been mistreated. 

The dzongpon of Punakha – who had emerged victorious – had broken with the central government and set up a rival Druk Desi while the legitimate druk desi sought the protection of the penlop of Paro and was later deposed. The British mission dealt alternately with the rival penlop of Paro and the penlop of Trongsa (the latter acted on behalf of the druk desi).

Battle 
Britain declared war in November 1864. Bhutan had no regular army, and what forces existed were composed of dzong guards armed with matchlocks, bows and arrows, swords, knives, and catapults. Some of these dzong guards, carrying shields and wearing chainmail armor, engaged the well-equipped British forces.

The fort, known at the time as Dewangiri, at Deothang was dismantled by the British during 1865. The British initially suffered a humiliating defeat at Deothang and when they recaptured Dewangiri they dismantled the fortress there to deny its use to Bhutanese forces.

The Duar War lasted only five months and, despite some battlefield victories by Bhutanese forces which included the capture of two howitzer guns, resulted in the loss of 20% of Bhutan's territory, and forced cession of formerly occupied territories. Under the terms of the Treaty of Sinchula, signed 11 November 1865, Bhutan ceded territories in the Assam Duars and Bengal Duars, as well as the 83 km² of territory of Dewangiri in southeastern Bhutan, in return for an annual subsidy of 50,000 rupees. The Treaty of Sinchula stood until 1910, when Bhutan and British India signed the Treaty of Punakha, effective until 1947.

Treaty of Sinchula

Below appears the text of the Treaty of Sinchula.

See also
Foreign relations of Bhutan
History of Bhutan
Treaty of Punakha

References

Bibliography
 
 

Conflicts in 1864
Conflicts in 1865
Wars involving Bhutan
Wars involving the United Kingdom
Wars involving British India
History of the Bengal Sappers
1864 in Bhutan
1865 in Bhutan
19th-century military history of the United Kingdom
Military history of Bhutan
Bhutan–India relations
Bhutan–United Kingdom military relations